Chan Ming Kong (born 1 July 1985 in Hong Kong) is a former Hong Kong professional footballer who played as a midfielder.

Club career

Hong Kong 08
Chan Ming Kong started his senior football career in Hong Kong 08. He made his first ever Hong Kong First Division appearances in a match against Happy Valley on 9 October 2005. He made a total of 9 appearances in his first First Division season.

He was the captain of the team in the beginning of the 2006–07 season, played as the captain for 4 matches. He made 13 league appearances and scored 1 goal in a match against Kitchee on 10 September 2006, although the goal did not help the team to win the game.

Citizen
Chan Ming Kong joined Citizen after Hong Kong 08 was dissolved.

He played his first league game for Citizen in a match against Rangers as a first XI, helping the team to win 4–0. He featured a total number of 9 league games in the 2007–08 season.

In the 2008–09 season, Chan Ming Kong did not feature too many league games, only making 3 appearances, including 2 on the starting line-up.

He then left the club and joined Happy Valley.

Happy Valley
He joined Happy Valley after spending 2 seasons in Citizen. He scored his first First Division goal for Happy Valley in a match against South China on 24 January 2010, but the goal did not help the team to win the match, suffered a defeat 2–6.

Pegasus
Chan Ming Kong transferred to Pegasus after Happy Valley failed to stay in the First Division. He played an important role in TSW Pegasus, playing most of the matches for the team.

In the 2010–11 season, he made 16 league appearances out of 18 league games for Pegasus as a center midfielder. Although he did not score any league goal, his great passing vision and creativity helped the team to achieve great results. For cup matches, he played 3 league cup matches and 2 FA Cup matches. He scored 1 cup goal in the Hong Kong League Cup final against South China on 27 March 2011. However, his goal was not enough for the team to win the champion. Pegasus was one of the Hong Kong clubs which featured 2011 AFC Cup group stage. Chan Ming Kong played all 6 group stage matches. However, the team did not qualify for the knock-out stage.

In the 2011–12 season, he was not as important as in the last season, only making 10 league appearances since he faced a great competition from Lau Nim Yat, Lau Ka Shing, Li Ka Chun and Eugene Mbome for his position. He made 4 Hong Kong Senior Challenge Shield games and helped the team to reach the semi-final, having lost to South China in two-legged tie. He also featured 2 matches for the team in Hong Kong League Cup and Hong Kong FA Cup respectively. After the season, he eventually left TSW Pegasus.

Southern
Chan Ming Kong joined newly promoted club Southern in June 2012. He made his debut for Southern on 1 September 2012, playing against Biu Chun Rangers at Sham Shui Po Sports Ground. The team eventually lost the match 3–1.

Lee Man
On 1 August 2017, it was revealed that Chan had joined Lee Man.

On 2 June 2020, Chan was named on a list of departures from the club.

Career statistics
 As of 1 October 2012

Honours

Club
Lee Man
 Hong Kong Sapling Cup: 2018–19

References

External links
 
 

Living people
Association football midfielders
Hong Kong footballers
1985 births
Hong Kong Premier League players
Hong Kong First Division League players
Citizen AA players
Happy Valley AA players
TSW Pegasus FC players
Southern District FC players
Hong Kong Rangers FC players
Lee Man FC players